Pauer is a surname. people with the name include:

Ernst Pauer (1826–1905),  Austrian pianist, composer and educator
Fritz Pauer (1943–2012), Austrian jazz pianist, composer and bandleader
Géza Pauer (born 1976), Hungarian sprinter
Jiří Pauer  (1919–2007), Czech composer
Maria Pauer (1734/36–1750), Austrian witch

See also
Paur